Donald Ray Seawell (August 1, 1912 – September 30, 2015) was an American cultural and civic leader, born in Jonesboro, North Carolina.  He was the founder of the Denver Center for the Performing Arts.

Personal life
Seawell's father was Aaron A. F. Seawell, a justice of the North Carolina Supreme Court. Donald graduated from the University of North Carolina, and UNC Law School. In 1941 he married Broadway actress, Eugenia Rawls, who played Tallulah Bankhead's daughter in The Little Foxes. They had two children. In August 2012 Seawell turned 100.

Career
Seawell was hired to work at the Securities and Exchange Commission by the newly appointed head of the organization, Joseph P. Kennedy. Kennedy had heard Seawell's unflattering comment about him on the radio, where the young lawyer said, "It takes a thief to catch a thief". This quote is widely attributed to Franklin Delano Roosevelt who knew Joseph Kennedy personally and appointed him to the SEC citing this reason. He was impressed by Seawell's candor, if not his character assessment, and wanted him on his team. During World War II Seawell worked on General Dwight D. Eisenhower's SHAEF staff in counterintelligence. After the war, he served briefly as assistant Ambassador to France.

Entering private law practice in New York City, he gathered many theatrical clients including, Tallulah Bankhead, Alfred Lunt and Lynn Fontanne. He also maintained law offices in London and Tel Aviv, and was involved in writing the charter for the State of Israel. Seawell's theatrical clients led to his becoming a Broadway producer, and his shows included: Noël Coward's Sail Away, The Affair, and A Thurber Carnival. He was the first producer to bring the Royal Shakespeare Company (RSC) to the United States in a 1962 production of The Hollow Crown. He later became a governor of the RSC as well as chairman of the American National Theatre and Academy. In 2002, he was awarded the honorary title, Order of the British Empire, by Queen Elizabeth II.

Seawell was one of three producers of Bonard Productions, the others being the actress Haila Stoddard, and The Denver Post owner Helen Bonfils. In the 1960s he joined forces with Ms. Bonfils to become secretary-treasurer of the Denver Post. After Helen Bonfils' death, he became publisher of the paper. Using funds from the Bonfils Foundation, he created The Denver Center for the Performing Arts in the late 1970s. He retired as active chairman of the center in 2007 at the age of 94.

Awards
B'nai B'rith Anti-Defamation League Heritage Award 1973
Distinguished Eagle Award, Boy Scouts of America 1976
Tony Award 1983
Arts & Entertainment Cable Network Award 1987
Third Millennium Leadership Award, American Diabetes Association 1995
Colorado Tourism Hall of Fame Award 1999
Mayor's Millennium Award 2000
In 2002, Queen Elizabeth awarded Donald Seawell The Order of the British Empire.
Colorado Festival of World Theatre Donald Seawell Award recipient 2005
In 2005, he became the 11th recipient of the National Theatre Hall of Fame's Founder's Award
Mayor's 2007 Cultural Legacy Award, Denver

References

External links
Denver Post article about Seawell's retirement in 2007

1912 births
2015 deaths
American centenarians
Men centenarians
People from Lee County, North Carolina
University of North Carolina School of Law alumni
20th-century American newspaper publishers (people)
Officers of the Order of the British Empire
American theatre managers and producers
United States Army personnel of World War II
Ambassadors of the United States to France
United States Army officers
Seawell family